Water Channel was a digital cable television channel that aired programming devoted to water sports.  It was the only channel of its kind in the world that focused on water lifestyle, featuring programming of interest to those who enjoy activities in and around water. Water Channel was independently owned and operated by MCE Television Networks Inc. The channel initially launched on Dish Network, but was removed due to a contract dispute. It was also available on various Time Warner Cable and Cox Cable systems. In late 2009, the channel ceased operations.

Programming focused on activities including fishing, boating, surfing, diving, racing, water skiing, and pleasure boating. An original television special about surfing called "Pulling In" was aired extensively on the Water Channel throughout its existence. The special was produced by Kauai Sound & Cinema.

References

Sports television networks in the United States
Defunct television networks in the United States
Television channels and stations disestablished in 2009
Television channels and stations established in 2006